Kirchspielslandgemeinde Wesselburen was an Amt ("collective municipality") in the district of Dithmarschen, in Schleswig-Holstein, Germany. On 25 May 2008, it merged with the Amt Kirchspielslandgemeinde Büsum and the town Wesselburen to form the Amt Büsum-Wesselburen. Its seat was in Wesselburen, itself not part of the Amt.

The Amt Kirchspielslandgemeinde Wesselburen consisted of the following municipalities (with population in 2005):

 Friedrichsgabekoog (71)
 Hellschen-Heringsand-Unterschaar (169)
 Hillgroven (86)
 Norddeich (430)
 Oesterwurth (274)
 Reinsbüttel (427)
 Schülp (489)
 Strübbel (96)
 Süderdeich (536)
 Wesselburener Deichhausen (142)
 Wesselburenerkoog (151)

Former Ämter in Schleswig-Holstein